The 1936 All-Ireland Senior Football Championship was the 50th staging of Ireland's premier Gaelic football knock-out competition. In the All Ireland semi-final Laois ended Cavan's year as All Ireland champions. Mayo won their first title.

Results

Connacht Senior Football Championship

Leinster Senior Football Championship

Munster Senior Football Championship

Ulster Senior Football Championship

All-Ireland Senior Football Championship

Championship statistics

Miscellaneous

 Roscommon's pitch becomes known as St. Coman's Park, until 1971 when it was replaced by Dr. Hyde Park.
 The following GAA grounds are named after famous people, Fitzgerald Stadium, Killarney after Dick Fitzgerald, Dr. Cullen Park in Carlow after Matthew Cullen & Cusack Park in Ennis after Michael Cusack.
 Laois win the Leinster title for the first time since 1889.
 Mayo are All Ireland champions for the first time ever becoming the second from Connacht after Galway in 1925 to do so.

References

All-Ireland Senior Football Championship